Katherine Mary Peyton (13 December 1965 – 9 February 2005) was a British journalist and senior producer for the BBC Johannesburg bureau from 2002 to 2005. She was killed in a shooting incident in Somalia whilst reporting on that country's nascent peace process.

Background
Peyton was born in Bury St Edmunds, Suffolk.  She was educated at Culford School and read civil engineering at Manchester University. However, while at university she found herself increasingly drawn to books and journalism and resolved to make a career as a producer in broadcasting.

On leaving university she got her first job, at BBC Radio Suffolk, and also worked at Radio Merseyside and GMR. Her long-term ambition as a young radio producer was eventually to work in South Africa, a country she had first visited with her family in 1979.

She finally moved to South Africa to work in the 1990s, firstly for the South African Broadcasting Corporation and the BBC as a freelance producer. She was eventually appointed to the post of Africa Producer for the BBC early in the new millennium. She covered many major stories, including the emerging AIDS crisis in South Africa, the Mozambique floods and the humanitarian emergency of Darfur.

Murder and aftermath
In February 2005, Peyton was warned by the BBC's Johannesburg bureau chief that there was concern over her perceived lack of focus. When she was asked to travel to Somalia to report on the situation there for the World Service, she saw it as a chance to demonstrate her commitment and improve the chances of her contract being renewed.

On arrival in Mogadishu, Peyton, accompanied by reporter Peter Greste, checked into the Sahafi Hotel. Only a few hours later she was shot in the back while standing outside the hotel, which was popular with politicians and journalists. She underwent emergency surgery but died later the same day in the hospital. It was later found by the United Nations that her killing was likely organised by the Al-Qaeda-affiliated military leader, Aden Hashi Farah.

After Peyton's death her family and friends raised questions over how much pressure to take on dangerous assignments was put on producers and reporters retained on short-term contracts. At the inquest into her death the coroner stated that while the BBC was not liable for Peyton's death, BBC managers had to recognise that staff had an over-riding right to turn down dangerous jobs, regardless of any fears they might have for their future employment.

See also
BBC newsreaders and journalists

References

External links
Independent newspaper obituary
Times newspaper obituary

1965 births
2005 deaths
Women war correspondents
Mass media people from Bury St Edmunds
People educated at Culford School
Alumni of the University of Manchester
BBC newsreaders and journalists
Deaths by firearm in Somalia
Journalists killed while covering the Somali Civil War
British women television journalists
British women radio presenters
20th-century British journalists